Realdo Kenneth Jessurun (born 5 September 1969) is a Surinamese former cyclist. He competed at the 1988 Summer Olympics and the 1992 Summer Olympics.

References

External links
 

1969 births
Living people
Surinamese male cyclists
Olympic cyclists of Suriname
Cyclists at the 1988 Summer Olympics
Cyclists at the 1992 Summer Olympics
Place of birth missing (living people)